The Kawanishi K-8 Transport Seaplane was a Japanese single-engined floatplane of the 1920s. Seven were built in 1926 and 1927, and were used to operate airmail services.

Design and development
In early 1925, Eiji Sekiguchi, chief designer of the aircraft department of Kawanishi Kikai Setsakuho (Kawanishi Machinery Manufacturing Works), started work on a long-range floatplane for use by Nippon Koku K.K. the airline subsidiary of Kawanishi on airmail services. The resulting design, the Kawanishi K-8A, was a single-engined monoplane with a fabric covered wooden structure. It was powered by a  Maybach Mb.IVa water-cooled inline-engine, as used in Kawanishi's successful K-7 biplane, but was larger and heavier than the K-7. The aircraft was fitted with a twin-float undercarriage, while the crew of two sat in open cockpits. The first prototype was completed in January 1926 with a shoulder-wing layout, but following aircraft had the wing raised to a parasol wing arrangement. The aircraft demonstrated relatively poor performance, but showed good stability, making it popular for long-distance flights. A total of 5 K-8As were completed in 1926, all going to Nippon Koku K.K..

The design attracted the attention of the Teiko Kaibo Gitai, (the Imperial Maritime Defence Volunteer Association), a patriotic organization, who placed an order for two modified aircraft, the Kawanishi K-8B, with reduced span wings, a slimmer fuselage and the crew cockpits moved rearwards. These two aircraft were completed in 1927, demonstrating improved performance.

Operational history
The five K-8As were all used by Nippon Koku for its airmail service between Osaka and Fukuoka. The two K-8Bs were used to carry out two formation tours around Japan in April and May 1927 in an effort to promote aviation. They were then leased free-of-charge to Nippon Koku on the condition that they would be transferred to the Imperial Japanese Navy on request. They joined the K-8As on the Osaka–Fukuoa airmail route, and were heavily used before they were retired in April 1929.

Variants
Kawanishi K-8A Transport Seaplane
Single-engined mailplane for Nippon Koku. Five built.
Kawanishi K-8B Transport Seaplane
Modified version of K-8A, with reduced wingspan  and improved performance ( speed and 9 hour endurance). Two built for Teiko Kaibo Gitai, and later used by Nippon Koku.

Operators

Nippon Koku K.K.

Specifications (K-8A)

Notes

References

1920s Japanese airliners
Floatplanes
K-8
Single-engined tractor aircraft
Parasol-wing aircraft
Aircraft first flown in 1926